Rudolf Götz (born April 10, 1983 in Prague) is a Czech sprinter, who specialized in the 400 metres. He set a personal best time of 45.78 seconds at the 2008 Ostrava Golden Spike in Ostrava, earning him a spot on the Czech track and field team for the Olympics. He is also a member of the athletics team for ASK Slavia Praha, and is coached and trained by Petr Novotny.

Gotz represented the Czech Republic at the 2008 Summer Olympics in Beijing, where he competed for the men's 400 metres. He ran in the fourth heat against seven other athletes, including Great Britain's Martyn Rooney and Jamaica's Ricardo Chambers, both of whom were heavy favorites in this event. He finished the race in sixth place by one hundredth of a second (0.01) ahead of Japan's Yuzo Kanemaru, with a time of 46.38 seconds. Gotz, however, failed to advance into the semi-finals, as he placed forty-second overall, and was ranked farther below three mandatory slots for the next round.

References

External links

Profile – Czech Athletics Federation 
NBC 2008 Olympics profile

1983 births
Living people
Czech male sprinters
Olympic athletes of the Czech Republic
Athletes (track and field) at the 2008 Summer Olympics
Athletes from Prague